Bryan Jeffrey Kramer is an American businessman, the co-founder and CEO of PureMatter; a social media agency. He is also an author, a social media strategist and founder of the #H2H (Human to Human) movement.

Career
Kramer started his advertising career in San Jose in a boutique advertising firm named Carter Waxman's Advertising and PR. He worked for SK Consulting as a management consultant, where he helped build and lead the interactive team to become one of the top 10 interactive agencies in Silicon Valley. Currently, he is the CEO of PureMatter. Kramer, with his team, developed what he called "The Shareability Quotient". It gives shareability factor a scientific touch by stating that the likelihood of a share ≥ (greater than or equals) perceived reputation of content or source. He has been noted for his TED Talk titled "Why Sharing is Reimagining our Future."

As a CEO
His company, PureMatter, was recognized by the Silicon Valley Business Journal as one of Silicon Valley's fastest-growing private companies.
Kramer's area of experience and expertise is marketing with a focus on human to human communication. Forbes named him among the top 25 Influencers to follow.

As an Author
Kramer has authored two books. His first book is "There Is No B2B or B2C: It's Human to Human #H2H" and his second book is "Shareology: How Sharing is Powering the Human Economy”. “There Is No B2B or B2C: It’s Human to Human #H2H” argues that the present ways of communication lack the appeal intended to attract clients and need to be adjusted and evolved to cater to the ever-growing social and digital world. It underlines the need of a simple and convincing message to penetrate through the many voices in the marketing arena. Furthermore, the book overviews the benefits of promoting a personal brand over a business brand.

Kramer advocates "Human to Human" (H2H) communications over business speak, that is "business to business" (B2B) or "business to consumer" (B2C). The view presented in his book is that the latter two ways of communication seem less human and hence are less engaging for present day businesses.

His other book, "Shareology, How Sharing is Powering the Human Economy", focuses on the difficult art and science of sharing online.
It examines the human nature of communication, studies how it evolved and presents tools and techniques for sharing. The ideas raised up in this book are elaborated with examples and case studies. Predicting future trends of sharing is also discussed at the latter part of the book. "Shareology" is an attempt to bring awareness to the businesses regarding the present complexities in the business world and how to transform those into simple solutions. Kramer conducted research work for this book which included interviewing more than 250 professionals from diverging fields to understand the concept of sharing. The professionals were from marketing backgrounds, academic professors and learned social media experts. This book contains over 300 actionable insights backed by relevant stories and was released in July 2014. Nearly 15,000 copies were sold in its first month. The book has been translated into two languages (Chinese and Russian), published by Morgan James and made the USA Today Top 150 best books.

Books
There Is No B2B or B2C: It's Human to Human #H2H
Shareology: How Sharing is Powering the Human Economy

References

American business executives
American business writers
Living people
Year of birth missing (living people)